The Sivas Congress was an assembly of the Turkish National Movement held for one week from 4 to 11 September 1919 in the city of Sivas, in central-eastern Turkey, which united delegates from all Anatolian provinces of the Ottoman Empire, defunct at the time in practical terms. At the time of the convention, the state capital (Constantinople) as well as many provincial cities and regions were under occupation by the Allied powers preparing for the partition of the Ottoman Empire. This was part of the wider conflict of the Turkish War of Independence.

Resolutions 
The call for the congress had been issued by Mustafa Kemal Atatürk with his Amasya Circular three months before and the preparatory work had been handled during the Erzurum Congress. The congress at Sivas took a number of vital decisions which were foundational in shaping the future policy to be conducted in the frame of the Turkish War of Independence. The Congress also united the multiple regional Defense of Rights Associations into the Association of the Defence of Rights of Anatolia and Rumelia.

Although smaller than the Erzurum Congress (with 38 delegates), the delegates came from a wider geographical area than was the case with the Erzurum Congress. Along with the Erzurum Congress, the Sivas Congress determined the main points of the Misak-ı Millî (National Pact) that the Turkish National Movement made with other Turkish resistance movements against the Allies to work together, namely the imperial government in Constantinople. The two bodies signed the Amasya Protocol the next month on 22 October 1919, calling for new elections after which the Ottoman Chamber of Deputies would consider the agreements of the Sivas Congress. Once word reached the occupying Allies in Constantinople, however, they dissolved the parliament, after which the remaining vestiges of the Ottoman imperial government would become antagonistic towards the Turkish National Movement based in Ankara.

Legacy 
After the war of independence, The Association of the Defence of Rights of Anatolia and Rumelia would become a formal political party and rename themselves the Republican People's Party (CHP.) They retroactively declared the Sivas Congress their first Congress. The CHP is one of Turkey's major political parties to this day.

The building where the Sivas Congress took place was acquired by the Ministry of Culture in 1984 at the request of President Kenan Evren. It has since been open to the public as the Sivas Congress and Ethnography Museum.

References

External links

Turkish War of Independence
History of Sivas
Sivas vilayet
1919 in the Ottoman Empire
1919 conferences